The 2006–07 Campionato Sammarinese di Calcio season was the twenty-second season since its establishment.

Regular season

Group A

Group B

Results
All teams play twice against the teams within their own group and once against the teams from the other group.

Championship play-offs

First round
The second place club will play the third place club from the opposite group.

Second round
The first round winners play the first place clubs from each group.

Third round
The losers from the first and second round play each other. The losers from this round are eliminated.

Fourth round
The second round winners play each other. The winner advances to the finals and loser moves to the semifinals.

The third round winners play each other and the loser is eliminated.

Semifinal
The winner advances to the finals and the loser is eliminated.

Libertas were qualified for the first qualifying round of the 2007–08 UEFA Cup as runner-up of 2006–07 Coppa Titano.

Final

Murata were qualified for the first qualifying round of the 2007–08 UEFA Champions League.

References
RSSSF.com

Campionato Sammarinese di Calcio
San Marino
1